Church of St George is a  Grade I listed church in Toddington, Bedfordshire, England. It became a listed building on 3 February 1967.

The church is grand and cruciform; it dates from the 13th, 14th and 15th centuries. The building materials are mainly Totternhoe stone and ironstone. The three-storeyed priest's house on the north side is unique.

Henry Cheyne, 1st Baron Cheyne is buried here.

See also
Grade I listed buildings in Bedfordshire

References

Church of England church buildings in Bedfordshire
Grade I listed churches in Bedfordshire